The opisthokonts are a broad group of eukaryotes, including both the animal and fungus kingdoms. The opisthokonts, previously called the "Fungi/Metazoa group", are generally recognized as a clade. Opisthokonts together with Apusomonadida and Breviata comprise the larger clade Obazoa.

Flagella and other characteristics

A common characteristic of opisthokonts is that flagellate cells, such as the sperm of most animals and the spores of the chytrid fungi, propel themselves with a single posterior flagellum. It is this feature that gives the group its name. In contrast, flagellate cells in other eukaryote groups propel themselves with one or more anterior flagella. However, in some opisthokont groups, including most of the fungi, flagellate cells have been lost.

Opisthokont characteristics include synthesis of extracellular chitin in exoskeleton, cyst/spore wall, or cell wall of filamentous growth and hyphae; the extracellular digestion of substrates with osmotrophic absorption of nutrients; and other cell biosynthetic and metabolic pathways. Genera at the base of each clade are amoeboid and phagotrophic.

History
The close relationship between animals and fungi was suggested by Thomas Cavalier-Smith in 1987, who used the informal name opisthokonta (the formal name has been used for the chytrids by Copeland in 1956), and was supported by later genetic studies.

Early phylogenies placed fungi near the plants and other groups that have mitochondria with flat cristae, but this character varies. More recently, it has been said that holozoa (animals) and holomycota (fungi) are much more closely related to each other than either is to plants, because opisthokonts have a triple fusion of carbamoyl phosphate synthetase, dihydroorotase, and aspartate carbamoyltransferase that is not present in plants, and plants have a fusion of thymidylate synthase and dihydrofolate reductase not present in the opisthokonts. Animals and fungi are also more closely related to amoebas than to plants, and plants are more closely related to the SAR supergroup of protists than to animals or fungi. Animals and fungi are both heterotrophs, unlike plants, and while fungi are sessile like plants, there are also sessile animals.

Cavalier-Smith and Stechmann argue that the uniciliate eukaryotes such as opisthokonts and Amoebozoa, collectively called unikonts, split off from the other biciliate eukaryotes, called bikonts, shortly after they evolved.

Taxonomy
Opisthokonts are divided into Holomycota or Nucletmycea (fungi and all organisms more closely related to fungi than to animals) and Holozoa (animals and all organisms more closely related to animals than to fungi); no opisthokonts basal to the Holomycota/Holozoa split have yet been identified. The Opisthokonts was largely resolved by Torriella et al. Holomycota and Holozoa are composed of the following groups.

 Holomycota (Fungus-like)
 Fungi
 Includes:
 chytrids (flagellated, zoosporic fungi)
 Fonticula (more recent work considers this to be part of Cristidiscoidea, a sister group to the fungi)
 Hyaloraphidium (previously thought to be a green alga, now considered a fungus)
 microsporidia (previously thought to be apicomplexia)
 Nucleariida (more recent work considers this to be part of Cristidiscoidea, a sister group to the fungi)
 Excludes:
 labyrinthulomycetes (slime nets) (now included in the SAR supergroup)
 myxomycetes (now included in amoebozoans)
 oomycetes (water molds) (now included in the SAR supergroup)
 Rozellida (placement uncertain)
 Holozoa (Animal-like)
 Corallochytrium (formerly considered a Heterokont)
 Filozoa
 Animalia (including myxozoa)
 Choanoflagellata (flagellates formerly included in protozoa)
 Filasterea
 Mesomycetozoea
 Amoebidiales (formerly considered trichomycetes)
 Dermocystida (formerly considered parasitic fungi or sporozoans)
 Eccrinales (formerly considered fungi)
 Ichthyophonida (formerly considered parasitic fungi incertae sedis)

Phylogeny

The choanoflagellates have a circular mitochondrial DNA genome with long intergenic regions. This is four times as large as animal mitochondrial genomes and contains twice as many protein coding genes.

Corallochytrium seem likely to be more closely related to the fungi than to the animals on the basis of the presence of ergosterol in their membranes and being capable of synthesis of lysine via the AAA pathway.

The ichthyosporeans have a two amino acid deletion in their EEF1A1 gene that is considered characteristic of fungi. 

The ichthyosporean genome is >200 kilobase pairs in length and consists of several hundred linear chromosomes that share elaborate terminal-specific sequence patterns.

In the following phylogenetic tree it is indicated how many millions of years ago (Mya) the clades diverged into newer clades. The holomycota tree is following Tedersoo et al.

One view of the great kingdoms and their stem groups. Phylogeny based on Steenkamp et al 2005, and Eichinger et al, 2005.

Gallery

References

External links

 Tree of Life Eukaryotes

 
Amorphea unranked clades